Route 179 is a highway in central Missouri. From its northern terminus at the interchange of Interstate 70 and Route 98, it winds its way Southeast over low rolling hills and through the flood plain along the Missouri River to Jefferson City, where it bypasses the city to the West via a four-lane divided highway between U.S. Route 50 and U.S. Route 54, its southern terminus. Towns on Route 179 are Overton, Wooldridge, Jamestown, Sandy Hook, Marion, and Jefferson City.

Major intersections

See also

 List of state highways in Missouri

References

External links

179
Transportation in Cole County, Missouri
Transportation in Moniteau County, Missouri
Transportation in Cooper County, Missouri